Diganta Television was a Bangladeshi Bengali-language privately owned satellite and cable news television channel founded in 2007. The channel was owned Diganta Media Corporation, which also owns the daily newspaper Daily Naya Diganta. Diganta Television officially began broadcasting on 28 August 2008, and was shutdown along with Islamic TV on 6 May 2013, both of which were assumed to be supporting the Jamaat-e-Islami political party, and as a result faced boycotts during the 2013 Shahbag protests.

Shutdown
The Bangladesh Telecommunication Regulatory Commission forcibly ceased the broadcast of Diganta Television, along with Islamic TV, on 6 May 2013, at about 4:30am. The channel's chief reporter M. Kamruzzaman said that around 25 plain-clothed policemen and an official from the broadcast commission had entered their studios without warning at dawn. According to Information Minister Hasanul Haq Inu, it was taken off the air because its reporting on raid on Hefazat-e-Islam Bangladesh contained "irresponsible exaggerations and misinformation to inflame public opinion, a violation of the conditions of its license."  Critics have alleged this an instance of the Sheikh Hasina government of using the Islamist issue to silence dissidents.

Programming
Diganta Television mostly aired news programming for sixteen hours per day. Other than that, other types of programming were aired on the channel.

List of programming 
 Business News
 Carrier Line
 Chitra Bichitra
 Diganta Onusandhan
 Duronto Khobor
 Ekanto Songlap
 Get Safe
 i-Tech
 Jibon Japon
 Lime Light
 Mele Dhori Ichcheguli
 News of the Day
 Pothe Prantore
 Probashe Bangladesh
 Ranna Banna
 School Angina
 Science & Quran
 Score Card
 Shastho Diganta
 Shorol Poth
 Suborno Shokal

See also
 List of television stations in Bangladesh

References

External links 
 Diganta Television Launched

Television channels in Bangladesh
Mass media in Dhaka
Television channels and stations established in 2008
Television channels and stations disestablished in 2013
Defunct television channels in Bangladesh